The undervoltage-lockout (UVLO) is an electronic circuit used to turn off the power of an electronic device in the event of the voltage dropping below the operational value that could cause unpredictable system behavior. For instance, in battery powered embedded devices, UVLOs can be used to monitor the battery voltage and turn off the embedded device's circuit if the battery voltage drops below a specific threshold, thus protecting the associated equipment. Some variants may also have unique values for power-up (positive-going) and power-down (negative-going) thresholds.

Usages 
Typical usages include:

 Electrical ballast circuits to switch them off in the event of voltage falling below the operational value.
 Switched-mode power supplies. When the system supply output impedance is higher than the input impedance of the regulator, an UVLO with a higher hysteresis should be used to prevent oscillations before settling down to a steady state and possible malfunctions of the regulator.

See also 
 No-volt release

References 

Electronic engineering
Voltage stability